Boishakh (Bôishakh, Baishakh) is the first month in the Assamese calendar, Bengali calendar and Nepali calendar. This month lies between the second half of April and the first half of May.

Etymology 
The name of the month is derived from the position of the Sun near the star Bishakha.

History 
The first day of Boishakh is celebrated as the Pôhela Bôishakh or Bengali New Year's Day. The day is observed with cultural programs, festivals and carnivals all around the country. The day of is also the beginning of all business activities in Bangladesh and neighboring Indian state of West Bengal and Tripura. The traders starts new fiscal account book called  Halkhata. The accounting in the Halkhata begins only after this day. It is celebrated with sweets and gifts with customers.

Season 
The month of Boishakh also marks the official start of Summer. The month is notorious for the afternoon storms called Kalboishakhi (Nor'wester). The storms usually start with strong gusts from the north-western direction at the end of a hot day and cause widespread destruction.

Agriculture 
Boishakh is the month when many of the seasonal fruits, especially mango, watermelon, and jackfruit become available. Green unripe mangoes are a particular delicacy of the month.

Observances marked (per official use in Bangladesh)
 Boishakh 1 - Pahela Baishakh
 Boishakh 2 - Jackie Robinson Day
 Boishakh 18 - International Workers' Day
 Boishakh 25 - Victory in Europe Day
 Boishakh 26 - Victory Day (9 May)
 Last Saturday of Boishakh -  United States Armed Forces Day

References

Months of the Bengali calendar
Nepali calendar